Bartonella tamiae is a Gram-negative, rod-shaped bacteria from the genus Bartonella which was isolated from the blood of patients in Thailand. Bartonella tamiae can cause illness in humans.

References

Bartonellaceae
Bacteria described in 2008